The Canadian Forces' Decoration (post-nominal letters "CD") is a Canadian award bestowed upon members of the Canadian Armed Forces who have completed twelve years of military service, with certain conditions. By convention, it is also given to the Governor General of Canada upon his or her appointment as viceroy, which includes the title of Commander-in-Chief in and over Canada. The decoration is awarded to all ranks, who must have a good record of conduct during the final eight years of claimed service.

The first Governor General to receive the CD was Viscount Alexander of Tunis in 1951. The medal was initially awarded to all members of the Royal Family who served in the Canadian Forces, even without completion of twelve years of service; this has, however, not been automatic since 1953.

Criteria
The decoration is awarded to officers and non-commissioned members of the Regular and Reserve forces, including honorary appointments within the Canadian Armed Forces. However, time served while on the Supplementary Reserve List does not apply.  The medal may be awarded to persons in possession of any long service, good conduct, or efficiency decoration or medal clasps, provided that the individual has completed the full qualifying periods of service for each award and that no service qualifying towards one award is permitted to count towards any other.

Service in the regular and reserve or auxiliary forces of the Commonwealth of Nations is counted towards the decoration if the final five years have been served with the Canadian Armed Forces and no other long service, good conduct, or efficiency medal has been awarded for the same service.

Appearance
The medal is decagonal (ten-sided, representing the ten provinces), 36 millimetres across the flats, with raised busts. The King George VI medal is .800 fine silver and gilded. The Queen Elizabeth II medal is tombac (a copper-zinc alloy). A gilded copper version was introduced in 2008. The King George VI medal has the uncrowned coinage head of King George VI, facing left, with the inscription  around the edge. The Queen Elizabeth II medal has the uncrowned coinage head of Queen Elizabeth II, facing right, with the inscription around the edge  with the word Canada at the bottom. The reverse of the medal has a naval crown, three maple leaves and an eagle representing the navy, army and air force from top to bottom. The word service is on a scroll at the base and a fleur-de-lis is on each side of the crown. The royal cypher is superimposed on the centre of the King George VI medal, but is omitted from the Queen Elizabeth II medal. The King George VI medal has the name and rank of the person to whom the medal was awarded engraved on the reverse of the solid bar while the Queen Elizabeth II medal has the name and rank engraved around the edge of the medal. Early Queen Elizabeth II medals had the letters stamped rather than engraved.

A clasp, also known as a bar, is awarded for every 10 years of subsequent service. This is indicated on the undress ribbon by a rosette.

Recipients of the Canadian Forces Decoration are entitled to use the post nominal letters "CD". This post-nominal is not affected by the awarding of clasps.

Further reading

Notes and references

External links
 
 
 View Decoration

Military awards and decorations of Canada
Awards established in 1949
1949 establishments in Canada
Long and Meritorious Service Medals of Britain and the Commonwealth